Swaran Lata,, 20 December 1924 –  8 February 2008) was a Pakistani film actress. She started her career in the film industry in British India and later moved to Pakistan. She was known as The Tragedy Queen after she proved her mettle in her emotional, tragic roles, her presence on the film screen and her moving dialogue delivery. She worked both in Bollywood and in Pakistani cinema.

Early life
Swaran Lata was born into a Siyal Khatri Sikh family in Rawalpindi, British India, now in Pakistan on 20 December 1924. She did her Senior Cambridge diploma from Delhi and then joined the Academy of Music and Arts, Lucknow. In the early 1940s, her family moved to Bombay. She acted in a total of 22 movies in British India from 1942 to 1948.

Swaran Lata later converted to Islam after she married Nazir Ahmed, a famous actor, director and producer at the time. She changed her name to Saeeda Bano. The Swaran-Nazir pair was a very creative couple, churning out many movies together both before and after the Partition of India in 1947.

Film career
An exceptional and wondrous story about how she entered the realm of acting trails Swaran. Her parents died when she was very young and she lived most of her adolescent life with her elder brother, whom she recalls "very strict" on her. However, it is the story of how she got discovered that Swaran tells with great passion: "I was a student at a college in Lucknow, India. When I was traveling from Delhi to Lucknow, a few film directors happened to see me. They approached me to act in films but I was not interested at first. One of them then went to my elder brother with the offer, and to my utmost surprise he agreed".

Swaran Lata started her career as a stage actress. Her first film was  Awaaz released in 1942. Swaran and Nazir migrated to Pakistan at the time of the Partition of India in 1947. They left everything they had behind in Bombay and shifted to Lahore, Punjab, Pakistan. The duo had to start from scratch and were considered among the pioneers of the early Pakistani film industry.

Swaran Lata was the lead actress of Pakistan's first ever silver jubilee film Pheray (1949). This film was a Punjabi film but she was comfortable as an Urdu language speaker who was educated in Lucknow, the home of Urdu littérateurs. For the film, she was coached in Punjabi language by Baba Alam Siahposh, a Punjabi poet, who was also one of the lyricists of the film songs.

As a lead actress, Laarey (1950), Naukar (1955), Heer (1955) were her famous films, and as a supporting actress, Sawaal (1966) was her famous film. From 1960 onwards, she cut back her film appearances and mainly shifted towards supporting roles  until she gracefully retired in 1971.

In her lifetime, Swaran worked with great names like Prithviraj Kapoor and Motilal in India and with Santosh Kumar, Darpan, Inayat Hussain Bhatti and Habib in Pakistan.

Personal life
She married actor Nazir Ahmed Khan and had four children including three daughters and one son. Her grandson is actor Nauman Ijaz.

Death
Swaran Lata died at the age of 83 in Lahore, Pakistan on 8 February 2008.

Filmography

Film

Other appearance

See also 
 List of Lollywood actors

References

External links
 , Swaran Lata filmography on IMDb website
 Filmography of actress Swaran Lata on Complete Index To World Film (CITWF) website Archived

1924 births
People from British India
People from Rawalpindi District
Actresses from Lahore
Pakistani film actresses
Converts to Islam from Sikhism
Punjabi people
20th-century Pakistani actresses
Actresses in Punjabi cinema
2008 deaths
Indian emigrants to Pakistan
21st-century Pakistani actresses
Actresses in Urdu cinema
20th-century Indian actresses
Indian film actresses
21st-century Indian actresses
Actresses in Hindi cinema